Grammy Gold is a Thai record label and a subsidiary of GMM Grammy that focuses on luk thung and mor lam music genre.

History 
Mike Phiromphon is considered to be the first artist under the said record label.

The record label has produced some notable milestones such as selling 1 million copies in 2002 of Tai Orathai's studio album entitled Grass Flowers in City and in 2012 with Yinglee Srijumpol's single "Your Heart for My Phone Number" which topped the Thai music charts and earned 217 million views on YouTube as of April 2014.

Roster

Current acts 
 Mike Phiromphon
 Siriporn Ampaipong
 Phai Phongsathon
 Tai Orathai
 Monkaen Kaenkoon
 
 Yinglee Srijumpol
 Bell Nipada
 
 
 Paowalee Pornpimon
 Vieng Narumon
 
 
 
 
 
 
 Kaothip Tidadin
 
 Dokaor Toongtong
 
 Satien Tummue
 
 
 Orapasaya Suksai
 
 Panglam Zivanalee
 
 
 Som Pueksa
 Neck Naruepon
 
 Iss Issarapong
 Packky Sakonnaree
 Tantai
 Oller
 Benz Muengley
 Kimkloy
 Rung Nakornpanom
 Ning Ileen
 Ja Singchai
 Tewten
 Pimmy
 Minitoy
 Supersa servant (Men Jirapong, Bank Ronnaporn, Pentor Songpol, Arm Warachai)
 4 Super Zab Girls (Dao Kunlayakorn, Earn Chuleeporn, Eyesa Napatarada, Bow Janthip)
 Miss Isan (Nampueng Sarita, Mai Chanikarn, May Chadaporn, Dao Priabdao, Helen Pichapha)

Former acts 
 
 Pornchai Wannasri
 Ekarat Suvarnabhumi
 Orawee Sujjanon
 Pu Jarunee Sansritim
 Sao Phuwan Potirach
 Sajai Walee
 
 
 Ple Chinorod
 Nueng Haruetai
 Kat Rattikarn
 
 Chai Sanuwat
 
 Sao Somparn Ampornpong
 Ekkapol Montrakarn
 Peeter Fodifai
 Duangjan Suwannee
 Patinyan Tangtrakul
 
 
 
 
 Rok-hon-huy
 Maithai Jaitawan
 
 Kamwhan Weerawed
 Kon-mor
 
 
 
 Arm Rachen
 Supanat Chalermchaichareonkij
 Don Palakul
 Oo (Oo)
 Chinnakrit Malizon
 Tak Watcharakorn
 
 
 Dawid Intee
 
 
 
 
 
 
 Takkatan Chollada
 
 EID Fly
 
 
 
 E-Sarnboy
 
 Got Jakrapun Arbkornburi
 EID Supakorn
 
 Job 2 Do
 
 
 
 Naka
 
 
 Saowanit Nawapun

Awards and nominations 
 The Diamond Creator Awards, from YouTube (2020)

References

External links 

GMM Grammy
Thai record labels
Record labels established in 1995